Macau, also spelled Makaua or Macaua, is a Hungarian version of Crazy Eights, where players play a single card in sequence in a manner similar to Uno. Unlike Uno, however, Makaó is played with a standard deck of 52 cards.  Makaó also involves bluffing so that the players do not necessarily have to play a card if they wish to save it for higher points later. Cheating is encouraged in order to make gameplay more varied and enjoyable.

When playing the game, the player that has one last card, cannot end the game with a 2 or 3 while playing in two, if the player has 2 cards which are the same, e.g 2 of spades and 2 of hearts, they call double Macau, however if the other player holds a card that is also a 2 of diamonds , the first player has to take pick up 6 cards from the deck. If played in a group, the player can end the game with a 2 and a 3. For example if one player is holding the last card, and the card is the 3 of spades, the next played must withdraw three cards unless they have a 2 to pass on to the next player, which will mean the next player must withdraw 5 cards from the deck. Summary: if you play Macau in two’s you can’t end with a 2,3, if you play in a group, you can end with any card.

Gameplay
2 or more players (up to 10) are dealt 5 cards each; the deck is then cut and the cut card becomes the first card in the discard pile. Play starts to the dealer's right.

The next card played must be of the same suit or the same value as the card on the top of the discard pile. If a 7 of spades was on the top of the discard pile, the player can play a 9 of spades or a 7 of clubs. Alternatively, an Ace or Joker can be played. If the player cannot play a card, they must draw from the deck.

Cards can be played in runs, i.e. 5 of Spades, 6 of Spades, 7 of Spades, 7 of Hearts, 8 of Hearts, 8 of Clubs, 7 of Clubs.

When an action card is played, the player next in sequence must complete the action or add to it to pass it onto the next player in sequence. When down to a single card, a player must say "Macau!". If an opponent calls Macau before the player, the player must draw a card. The winner of the game is the first player to have no cards; in instances of more than 2 players, gameplay continues until only one player is left with cards.

Action Cards
If a 2 is played, the next player in the sequence must pick up 2 cards unless they have a 2, in which case they can add this to the original 2 and the next player in the sequence must pick up 4 cards and so on.
If a 3 is played, the next player in the sequence must pick up 3 cards unless they have a 3, in which case they can add this to the original 3 and the next player in sequence must pick up 6 cards and so on.
If a 4 is played, the next player in the sequence must miss a go, unless they have a 4, in which case they can add this to the original 4 and the next player in sequence miss 2 goes.
If a Jack is played, the player placing the Jack can call for a non-action card value, which they must hold - if they do not hold the value they are calling, they must call for 'any non-action card', the player in sequence must either play the card value called or place another Jack down and call a different value.
If a King of Spades is played, the previous player in the sequence must pick up 5 cards, unless they have a King of spades or hearts or queen of hearts, in which case they can add this to the original King and the next player in the sequence must pick up 10 cards.
If a King of Hearts is played, the next player in the sequence must pick up 5 cards, unless they have a King of spades or hearts or queen of hearts, in which case they can add this to the original King and the next player in the sequence must pick up 10 cards.
If a Joker is played, the sequence is reversed, i.e. clockwise play becomes anti-clockwise.
If an Ace is played, the player playing the Ace must call a suit different what it is in play. They must hold a card of the suit they are calling, if not, they must call 'free suit' and the next player in sequence can play any suit other than that already in play.

Multiples action cards can be played, i.e. Player 1 plays three 2s and the next player in the sequence must pick up 6 cards unless they have another 2. This is the same for 3's, 4's and Kings.

When a player gets down to 1 card they must say Macau or if another player catches them not saying Macau they must draw 5 cards

Variations

Romanian variation 

In Romania the game is called Macao (or Macaua) and it has some variations according to a region. The rules are a bit different from the ones explained above and the special, or action, cards change a bit. The rules below are the most common around Romania.

2s and 3s remain "draw 2" and "draw 3" cards.

Jokers are like 2s and 3s, but with a twist, they are wild cards and may be placed regardless of suit, that is, the player following the one who draws cards as a result of the Joker being played may play any card regardless of suit. Usually, the black Joker means "draw 5".
4s are "skip a turn" cards.
Aces are wild cards used to change the suit.

Tel-Aviv Variation (also known as the London Variation)
2 players are dealt 7 cards each, 3 or more players are dealt 5 cards each; the top card of the deck then becomes the first card in the discard pile. Play starts to the dealer’s left.

As with the standard gameplay, the next card must be of the same suit or same value. Alternatively, an Ace or a Queen can be played (Jokers are not used in this version). If a player cannot play a card, they must take one from the deck. If the player can play the card they may choose to do so, if they cannot then the next player gets to go. The winner is the one who loses all his cards first.

If a 2, 3, or King of Hearts is played, the attacked player must pick up the appropriate number of cards, and the next player is allowed to play a card.

Special Cards:
 Aces and Queens may be played at any time. A Queen changes the suit of the discard pile to whatever suit the queen is. With an Ace, a player may choose a suit of his choice.
 A player may only play 1 card per turn, with the exception of a 5. If a player plays a 5— must be of the same suit as the top card of the discard pile—then the player may play another card on top of that (same suit, Ace, Queen). The player may play multiple 5’s in a turn. In such a case, the player would play the 5s then another card. If a player plays a 5 and cannot play another card from his hand, they must pick up from the deck. If they can play that card, they may do so.
 If a player plays a 2, the next player must pick up 2 cards unless they have another 2. If they play a 2 the next player must pick up 4, and so on.
 If a player plays a 3, the next player must pick up 3 cards unless they have another 3. If they play a 3 the next player must pick up 6, and so on.
 If a player plays the King of Hearts, the next player must pick up 5 cards.
With one card left, a player must call out “Macau.” If they fails to do so before the next player’s turn, they must then pick up 2 cards.
If a player has a 5 and another card as his last cards and can play them together, they need not say Macau after the 5 is played.
If a 5 is the last card in a player’s hand, when they play it they must pick up a new card. If they can play it, they wins. If they cannot, the player then keeps the card and says “Macau.”

Players may choose to have a series of games using points. The game is played until 500, and points are bad; the first one to 500 loses.
The point system is as follows:
 4-9 are worth 5 points
 10s and face cards are worth 10 points
 2s are worth 20, and 3s are worth 30
 Aces are worth 50 points
 The King of Hearts is worth 150 points

Pławno Variation 
A version of the game invented in Pławno. The rules are a bit different from the ones explained above and the special, or action cards, change the game a bit. In this game, a scenario called a war and deception can be created when players consecutively play 'special cards' to make other players increase their card count.

 War is started when 2, 3, King of Spades (to a previous player) or King of Hearts is played. Causing players to pick up cards. When a war starts, players can play any 2s and 3s as the suit and value are being ignored during the war. Players can also play King of Spades and King of Hearts regardless of the suit currently on the deck and value of the cards as long as they are 2, 3 or mentioned Kings. Queen of Hearts can be played anytime to stop the war. In this variation of the game, players can often pick up as many as 20 cards (they all add up, e.g. 2+3+2+King of Spades+King of Heart=17).
 When King of Spades is played the previous player must pick up 5 cards or play another action card (any 2, 3, King of Hearts, King of Spades (to a previous player). If King of Spades is played, the next player is the one who played an original King of Spades.
 Joker replaces any card.
 If a Jack or Ace is played, the player placing the Jack or Ace can call for a non-action card value (in case of Jack) or a suit (in case of Ace). The difference is that the suit is ignored and any Jack can be placed on any Ace, and any Ace can be placed on any Jack, therefore, ignoring the requested suit or value of the previous player.
 Minimum of two cards (or more) with the same value must be placed together.
 If a 4 is played the deception part starts, and the next player in sequence must miss a go, unless they have a 4 (if they don't have a 4 or they chose not to play the 4, they don't pick a card from the deck), in which case they can add this to the original 4, and the next player in sequence must miss a go, unless they have a 4, in which case they can add this to the original 4 and so on. If no one else has a 4 then the last player, who put 4 plays as many times as there are 4s. For example, if there are four 4s after the last player played the 4, the player must play four times. Note: The last player will play four times against him/her self, that also include all the action cards which will apply to the player him/herself. The deception is when someone doesn't want to play a 4 but has it and can play a 4 after everyone said they don't/have a 4 causing this player to have more turns.

Gameplay

2 or more players are dealt 5 cards each; after that, the top card from the deck is then placed on the table. Play starts to the dealer's right.

The next card played must be of the same suit or the same value as the card on the table. For example, If a 7 of spades was on the table, the player can play a 9 of spades or a 7 of clubs or any other card that matches 7 or spades. If the player cannot play a card, they must draw from the deck.

Cards cannot be played in runs, i.e. 5 of Spades, 6 of Spades, 7 of Spades, 7 of Hearts, 8 of Hearts, 8 of Clubs, 7 of Clubs but a minimum of two or more the same value cards can be played.

When an action card is played, the player next (or previous depend on the action card) in the sequence must complete the action or add to it to pass it onto the next player in sequence. When down to a single card, a player must say "Macau!". If a player forgets to call "Macau" before the next players move, the player must draw 5 cards. The winner of the game is the first player to have no cards; in instances of more than 2 players, gameplay continues until only one player is left with cards. In case of Macau Championships once the first player to have no cards wins and the game stops. The winner shuffles the cards and the new game starts. One point is then assigned to the winner.

For the avoidance of doubt:
If the player plays King of Spades and King of Hearts with King of Hearts on top the next player will pick up 5 cards as the top card takes precedence in this case.

War

In this game, a scenario called a war and deception can be created when players consecutively play 'special cards' to make other players increase their card count.

War is started when 2, 3, King of Spades (to a previous player) or King of Hearts is played. Causing players to pick up cards. When a war starts, players can play any 2s and 3s as the suit and value are being ignored during the war. Players can also play King of Spades and King of Hearts regardless of the suit currently on the deck and value of the cards as long as they are 2, 3 or mentioned Kings. Queen of Hearts can be played anytime during the war to stop the war causing the player to not pick up any cards. In this variation of the game, players can often pick up as many as 20 cards (they all add up, e.g. 2+3+2+King of Spades+King of Heart=17).

When King of Spades is played the previous player must pick up 5 cards or play another action card (any 2, 3, King of Hearts, King of Spades (to a previous player)). After the previous player, the game goes back to the player who played King of Spades.

Action Cards

2, 3, King of Spades, King of Hearts - War cards that cause players to pick up cards (2,3,5 respectively).

If a Jack or Ace is played, the player placing the Jack or Ace can call for a non-action card value (in case of Jack) or a suit (in case of Ace). The difference is that the suit is ignored and any Jack can be placed on any Ace, and any Ace can be placed on any Jack, therefore, ignoring the requested suit or value of the previous player.The queen may be placed on the top of any non-action card no matter the suit or value.

If a 4 is played the deception part starts, and all the players must miss a go, unless they have a 4 (if they don't have a 4 or they chose not to play the 4, they don't pick a card from the deck), in which case they can add this to the original 4, and all players in sequence must miss a go, unless someone has a 4, in which case they can add this to the original 4 and so on. If no one else has a 4 then the last player, who put 4 plays as many times as there are 4s. For example, if there are four 4s after the last player played the 4, the player must play four times. Note: the last player will play four times against him/herself, that also include all the action cards which will apply to the player him/herself. The deception is when someone doesn't want to play a 4 but has it and can play a 4 after everyone said they don't/have a 4 causing this player to have more turns.

Joker replaces any card.

Open Cards
The more difficult version of Macau Wars (and any Macau variation) is a game played with open cards. That means that all the players cards and the draw deck is shown. This is similar to Chess where by knowing all the cards players must think about strategy and future moves. Open cards variation might take hours to finish.

Easier - Harder 
To make the game harder or easier, players agree upon a few extra rules before starting play.

Easier: 2s and 3s are wild when placed on other draw cards, so a 2 of clubs may be placed on a three of hearts to pass the penalty to the next player in turn.
Harder: 2s and 3s are used like normal cards, but still keep their meaning, that is, the player draws 3 or 2 cards.
Easier: Cards regardless of their meaning as the special card may be placed in small packs at once if all have the same numeric or literal value. If a player holds several queens, they may place all queens in one turn, if one of the queens is of the same suit as the suit on the discard stack, thus changing the suit and discarding more cards at once. If the cards are draw cards their effects stack as well. So, if three 2s are placed at once the next player must draw 6 cards. If this rule applies, a player may finish the game without calling out "Macao" or, usually to provoke other players to change their strategy, the player wants to call out "Multiple Macao".
Easier: Jokers can be placed in packs with 2s or 3s.
Harder: 7s may be used as wild cards but they only change the suit to their own. So if a seven of clubs is played, regardless of suit, the next card to be played is required to be a seven or a card of clubs.

References

Hungarian card games
Eights group
French deck card games
20th-century card games